Flight 350 may refer to:

Japan Airlines Flight 350, crashed on 9 February 1982
Iberia Airlines Flight 350, crashed on 7 December 1983

0350